Band-e Osman Bazar (also Romanized as Band-e ʿOs̄mān Bāzār) is a village in Pir Sohrab Rural District, in the Central District of Chabahar County, Sistan and Baluchestan Province, Iran. At the 2006 census, its population was 319, in 56 families.

References 

Populated places in Chabahar County